Justice McClain may refer to:

Andrew McClain (1826–1913), associate justice of the Tennessee Supreme Court
Emlin McClain (1851–1915), associate justice of the Iowa Supreme Court

See also
David L. McCain (1931–1986), associate justice of the Florida Supreme Court
John McLean (1785–1861), associate justice of the Ohio Supreme Court and the U.S. Supreme Court